The Law Society of New Brunswick is the statutory body charged with the regulation of the legal profession in the Canadian province of New Brunswick. 

The Law Society is a member of the Federation of Law Societies of Canada, an association of the fourteen provincial and territorial bodies governing the legal profession across Canada.

History
In 1846, the Law Society was incorporated as the "Barristers' Society" for the "purpose of securing in the Province a learned and honourable legal profession, for establishing order and good conduct among its members and for promoting knowledgeable development and reform of the law".

Role
The objects and duties of the Society are: (1) to uphold and protect the public interest in the administration of justice; (2) to preserve and protect the rights and freedoms of all persons; (3) to ensure independence, integrity and honor of its members; (4) to establish standards of education, professional responsibility and competence of its members and applicants to membership; (5) to regulate the legal profession.

References

External links
 Law Society of New Brunswick
 

Law societies of Canada
New Brunswick law
Organizations based in New Brunswick
1846 establishments in Canada

Organizations established in 1846